Ambato Ambarimay is a rural municipality in Madagascar. It belongs to the district of Ambato-Boeni, which is a part of Boeny Region. The population of the commune was estimated to be approximately 35,000 in 2001 commune census.

In addition to primary schooling the town offers secondary education at both junior and senior levels. The town has a permanent court and hospital. The majority 65% of the population of the commune are farmers, while an additional 10% receives their livelihood from raising livestock. The most important crop is peanuts, while other important products are cotton, rice and cowpeas.  Services provide employment for 10% of the population. Additionally fishing employs 15% of the population.

References and notes 

Populated places in Boeny